Holzbrücke Bad Säckingen (German name) or Säckingerbrücke (Swiss name) is a bridge over the Rhine. It connects the German city of Bad Säckingen with the village Stein in Switzerland. The covered bridge spans  over the Hochrhein and is the longest roofed wooden bridge in Europe. The bridge is listed as a national registered monument in Switzerland (Kulturgut von nationaler Bedeutung im Kanton Aargau).

The bridge was built in 1272 and was destroyed several times (1570, 1633, 1678). The current bridge was completed in 1700. Originally a road bridge, the bridge is now only open for pedestrians since the Fridolinsbrücke (Swiss name: Rheinbrücke Stein) was opened in 1979 for road traffic.

See also
List of bridges over the Rhine
 List of bridges in Germany
 List of bridges in Switzerland
Other big wooden bridges in Switzerland
Kapellbrücke
Auguetbrücke

References

External links

Bridges over the Rhine
Pedestrian bridges in Germany
Pedestrian bridges in Switzerland
Road bridges in Germany
Road bridges in Switzerland
Covered bridges in Switzerland
Wooden bridges in Germany
Wooden bridges in Switzerland
Transport in Baden-Württemberg
Buildings and structures in Aargau
Germany–Switzerland border crossings
International bridges
Säckingerbrücke
1270s in the Holy Roman Empire
Bridges completed in 1700
International bridges in Germany
Wooden buildings and structures in Germany
Wooden buildings and structures in Switzerland
1700 establishments in Europe
18th-century architecture in Switzerland
18th-century architecture in Germany